Hypsopygia ecrhodalis is a species of snout moth in the genus Hypsopygia. It was described by George Hampson in 1917. It is found in Cameroon.

References

Moths described in 1917
Pyralini